Borborud may refer to:
Borborud-e Gharbi Rural District
Borborud-e Sharqi Rural District